HM Inspectorate of Prisons for Scotland was established in 1981, following recommendations of the May Committee report of 1979. The Inspectorate is directly funded by the Scottish Government.

As of July 2018, His Majesty's Chief Inspector of Prisons for Scotland is Wendy Sinclair-Gieben.

Origins
His Majesty's Chief Inspector of Prisons for Scotland was created following a Committee of Inquiry into the prison system in the United Kingdom, whose report was published in 1979. One of the recommendations of its report was the creation of a new type of Prisons' Inspectorate, independent of the Prison Service. Previously inspections had been carried out by a Prison Governor. With the Scottish Prison Service being separate from its counterpart in England and Wales two inspectorates were created with prisons in England and Wales inspected by His Majesty's Chief Inspector of Prisons.

Remit and jurisdiction
His Majesty's Chief Inspector of Prisons for Scotland was placed on a statutory basis by an Act of Parliament, the Prisons (Scotland) Act 1989; its functions and responsibilities are laid down accordingly. The Chief Inspector submits an annual report to the Scottish Parliament. Reports on individual prison visits are made to the Scottish Government and are subsequently published. The Scottish Ministers may also refer specific prison-related matters to the Chief Inspector for him to report on.

The Inspectorate carries out a regular inspection of Scotland's prisons (including the privately run prisons). Each of Scotland's 16 prisons is normally subject to a full inspection every three years. Annual shorter, follow-up visits - which may be unannounced - are also made. Issues examinined include actual physical conditions, the quality of prisoner regimes, morale of staff and prisoners, facilities and amenities available to staff and prisoners, safety issues, and decency and contribution to reducing re-offending. The Inspectorate also inspects Legalised Police Cells (mainly used in rural parts of northern Scotland) and the conditions of prisoner escort arrangements.

The Inspectorate can only make recommendations; it has no executive power to enforce these recommendations. The inspection system is identical for both the state-run and privately managed prisons.

Personnel
The post of HM Chief Inspector of Prisons for Scotland is full-time. It has always been a lay appointment (an individual with no previous connection with the prison service). The Chief Inspector is appointed by the Crown under section 7 of the Prisons (Scotland) Act 1989. The Inspectorate's office is located in Edinburgh.

Although the Chief Inspector is entirely independent of the Scottish Prison Service, he is assisted by two senior managers seconded from the Service. They offer professional advice and guidance in during the conduct of inspections. The Inspectorate team also includes a Scottish Government civil servant and a Personal Secretary. The Inspectorate works with other statutory Inspectorates responsible for issues such as health, education and additions.

Previous HM Chief Inspectors
Philip Barry, 1981–1985
Thomas Buyers, 1985–1989
Alan Bishop, 1989–1994
Clive Fairweather, 1994–2002
Andrew McLellan CBE, 2002–2009
Brigadier (Ret.) Hugh Munro, 2009–2013
David Strang CBE QPM, 2013-2018

See also
Scots law
Scottish Court Service
State Hospitals Board for Scotland

References

External links

BBC News report on the appointment of Andrew McLellan, 2002

Penal system in Scotland
 
Public bodies of the Scottish Government
1981 establishments in Scotland
Government agencies established in 1981
Organisations based in Edinburgh
1981 in law